Kŭp is a North Korean military rank that is the equivalent of a corporal in most other countries.  The rank of kŭp is divided into three grades, those being:

 Sanggŭp (senior corporal)
 Chunggŭp (corporal)
 Ch'ogŭp (lance corporal)

The rank of kŭp is junior to that of hasa, considered the first non-commissioned officer rank of North Korea.  The South Korean equivalent to kŭp is known as byeong.

See also 
 Sergeant
 Chonsa

Military ranks of North Korea